Buxton Place is a historic plantation / farm complex and national historic district located near Inez, Warren County, North Carolina.  The main house was built by John A. Waddell, an associate of Jacob W. Holt, starting about 1857.  It is a two-story, double pile, Greek Revival / Italianate style frame dwelling.  It has a low hipped roof and nearly full width front porch.  Other contributing resources are the mid-19th century smokehouse, water tower (1918), barn (c. 1942), carriage house (c. 1930), chicken house (c. 1940), service station/store (c. 1930), a slave house or kitchen (mid-19th century), cotton gin (c. 1930), packhouse (c. 1940), workshop (c, 1930), family cemetery, and the agricultural landscape.

It was listed on the National Register of Historic Places in 1993.

References

Plantation houses in North Carolina
Houses on the National Register of Historic Places in North Carolina
Farms on the National Register of Historic Places in North Carolina
Historic districts on the National Register of Historic Places in North Carolina
Greek Revival houses in North Carolina
Italianate architecture in North Carolina
Houses completed in 1857
Buildings and structures in Warren County, North Carolina
National Register of Historic Places in Warren County, North Carolina
1857 establishments in North Carolina